Cheshmeh Saran may refer to:
Cheshmeh Saran, Iran, in Hamadan Province
Cheshmeh Saran District, in Golestan Province
Cheshmeh Saran Rural District, in Golestan Province